Karen Burke (born 14 July 1971) is an English footballer. She most recently played for Blackburn Rovers Ladies. Burke was born in Liverpool and represented England at full international level.

Club career
Burke only took up football aged 21, with a spell at St. Helens. In 1994 she reached her first FA Women's Cup final with Knowsley United. Burke hit the crossbar in injury time as Knowsley lost 1–0 to Doncaster Belles. In the following year's final, with Knowsley now known as Liverpool Ladies, player-of-the-match Burke twice put them ahead against Arsenal, only for Marieanne Spacey to seal a 3–2 win for The Gunners. In summer 1995 Burke agreed to join Everton Ladies, but changed her mind when Liverpool appointed John Bennison—a professional coach from the Liverpool "Boot Room".

In April 1996 Burke lost her third consecutive FA Women's Cup final to Croydon, on penalties after a 1–1 draw at the New Den. Luckless Burke had given Liverpool the lead and converted her penalty in the shootout. She finally joined Everton Ladies in the 1997 close season and won the Premier League title in 1997–1998. She played in Iceland in summer 1998, 1999 and 2000, with ÍBV.

In 2000 Burke and teammate Becky Easton joined Doncaster Belles. Burke would travel twice weekly to Doncaster from her base in Liverpool, where she worked in a pub. The 2002 FA Women's Cup Final was Burke's fourth unsuccessful appearance, as Doncaster were beaten 2–1 by the full-time professionals of Fulham.

Burke moved to Leeds United Ladies for 2002–2003 before spending the 2003 close season back with Icelandic side ÍBV. She returned to Doncaster Belles for 2003–2004, before joining an exodus of players brought about by a cash crisis and moving back to Leeds, via another stint at ÍBV. Burke then suffered more FA Women's Cup final disappointment with Leeds United Ladies, in their 5–0 defeat against Arsenal in 2006.

Burke left Leeds to join Blackburn Rovers Ladies in the 2007 close season. Although signed as an attacking midfielder, she moved to right-back for the 2009–10 season.

International career
Burke has won over 50 caps for the England senior team.

International goals
Scores and results list England's goal tally first.

Blackburn statistics
To October 2009

References

1971 births
Living people
English women's footballers
England women's international footballers
Liverpool F.C. Women players
Everton F.C. (women) players
Doncaster Rovers Belles L.F.C. players
Leeds United Women F.C. players
Blackburn Rovers L.F.C. players
Footballers from Liverpool
FA Women's National League players
1995 FIFA Women's World Cup players
Expatriate women's footballers in Iceland
English expatriate women's footballers
Women's association football midfielders
Karen Burke